Aleksandar Cvetković may refer to:
 Aleksandar Cvetković (basketball)
 Aleksandar Cvetković (footballer)
 Aleksandar Cvetković (politician)